is a passenger railway station located in the city of Kasama, Ibaraki Prefecture, Japan operated by the East Japan Railway Company (JR East).

Lines
Shishido Station is served by the Mito Line, and is located 48.5 km from the official starting point of the line at Oyama Station.

Station layout
The station consists of a single curved side platform serving traffic in both direction. The Station is staffed.

History
It was renamed to its present name on 25 May 1889. The station was absorbed into the JR East network upon the privatization of the Japanese National Railways (JNR) on 1 April 1987. A new station building was completed in July 2012.

Passenger statistics
In fiscal 2019, the station was used by an average of 336 passengers daily (boarding passengers only).

Surrounding area
 
Kita-Kantō Expressway Tomobe IC
Shishido Post Office

See also
 List of railway stations in Japan

References

External links

  Station information JR East Station Information 

Railway stations in Ibaraki Prefecture
Mito Line
Railway stations in Japan opened in 1889
Kasama, Ibaraki